Korean School in Yantai (Korean: 연대한국학교) is a Korean international school in Laishan District, Yantai, Shandong, China.

It was established on March 5, 2001. It serves levels kindergarten through senior high school.

Its campus was previously elsewhere in Chenjia Village, Chujia Town, Laishan District.

See also
 Koreans in China

References

External links
 Korean School in Yantai 

Yantai
Korean international schools in China
High schools in Shandong
Schools in Shandong
2001 establishments in China
Educational institutions established in 2001